Grace Hayes (August 3, 1895 – February 1, 1989) was an American actress, singer, vaudeville entertainer and nightclub owner. 

Hayes owned the Grace Hayes Lodge in the San Fernando Valley in Los Angeles, California, and later the Las Vegas nightclub, the Red Rooster which she renamed the Grace Hayes Lodge, that was frequented by Howard Hughes and Bugsy Siegel. She is the mother of Peter Lind Hayes and mother-in-law to Mary Healy. She appeared in Zis Boom Bah (1941) in which she played herself, her son and daughter-in-law also appeared in the film; as well as other films. Hayes also appeared on Broadway.

Early life
Hayes was born in Springfield, Missouri, but moved to California when she was ten years old. She married Joseph Lind, Sr. in 1912, when she was 17. In 1915 their son, Joseph Conrad Lind was born, later he became known as Peter Lind Hayes. In 1917, Lind, Sr. died. After Lind's death, Hayes married Charlie Foy and later Robert Evans Hopkins.

Career
Hayes began singing in nightclubs when she was fourteen years old. She teamed up with Neville Fleeson and performed at The Palace in New York, and later added her son, Peter Lind Hayes, to the act. She appeared in many Broadway shows including A Night in Spain.

Hayes opened a nightclub called the Grace Hayes Lodge in Los Angeles, CA. Hayes moved Las Vegas, Nevada in 1947, she purchased the Red Rooster and later renamed it to the Grace Hayes Lodge, where it was frequented by Howard Hughes and Bugsy Siegel.

Filmography

Film

Theatre

References

External links
 
 

1895 births
1989 deaths